The Capitol Steps was an American political-satire group that performed from 1981 to 2020. Most of the Capitol Steps' material parodied well-known contemporary songs. The songs were interspersed with other routines, including a spoonerism routine ("Lirty Dies") near the end of each performance with innuendoes about recent scandals. They have released over 40 albums, primarily song parodies. Originally consisting of congressional staffers who performed around Washington, D.C., the troupe was later primarily made up of professional actors and singers. The Capitol Steps have performed on PBS, public radio and in small- and medium-size venues around the United States. On January 13, 2021, the Capitol Steps announced via Twitter that they would be shutting down after 39 years of performing. The shutdown is due to the loss of revenue as a result of the COVID-19 pandemic.

Reagan years
In 1981, three Republican congressional staffers (Bill Strauss, Elaina Newport, and Jim Aidala) used their spare time at the Subcommittee on Energy, Nuclear Proliferation, and Government Processes of the Senate Committee of Governmental Affairs to write and sing parodies of current events. Joined by fellow Republican Senate staffers Nancy Baskin, Barbie Granzow and Dave Nichols, they decided on a Christmas show as their first performance while continuing to work full-time as congressional staffers. They chose "The Capitol Steps" as their group name because of a sex scandal earlier that year in which Congressman John Jenrette had sex with his wife, Rita, on the steps of the Capitol Building.

Their first show was a December 11, 1981 Christmas party for the Senate Foreign Relations Committee. The performers, considering the show a success, performed the same songs several more times that month. In 1982, the group expanded to include House staffers and Democrats. Despite being predominantly Republican, they tried to make their shows bipartisan with a roughly-even mix of songs lampooning Democrats and Republicans. Although the group attracted media interest at the time, they refused interview requests out of concern that their jobs could be endangered by press coverage and their behavior might affect Strauss and Newport's subcommittee chair Charles H. Percy.

In February 1983, the Capitol Steps began to perform monthly at the Shoreham Hotel and became open to publicity for the first time. They received a favorable review in The Washington Post, and their performances were successful. In November 1984, they performed at Percy's election-night party; during the party they learned that the senator had lost the election, and Strauss and Newport would lose their jobs with him. Shortly afterwards, the Capitol Steps became a professional group and recorded their first album: Capitol Steps Live! at the Shoreham.  By this time, the group was performing weekly at the Shoreham. They later moved to The Bread Oven on Pennsylvania Avenue, near the White House, and in the fall of 1986 the Capitol Steps began performing on a regular basis at Chelsea's Cabaret in the Georgetown area.

After Percy's loss, Strauss decided to work full-time for the Capitol Steps. Newport went to work for Sen. Al D'Amato. Aidala went to work at the US Environmental Protection Agency. At this time, the group included David Gencarelli, Richard Paul, Anne Hill, Ann Schmitt, Brian Ash, and Mike Loomis; all except Loomis and Gencarelli were still with the group in 2012 with Newport. In September 1988, the Capitol Steps performed at the White House for an audience which included President Ronald Reagan, his wife Nancy, and hundreds of members of Congress. The president enjoyed the show. The Capitol Steps released five albums during Reagan's two presidential terms, including Thank God I'm A Contra Boy, We Arm the World, and Workin' 9 to 10.

George H. W. Bush years

The Capitol Steps had performed twice for President Bush when he was Vice President -- at his office's Christmas party in 1987 and at an intimate dinner party in the Vice President's Residence in 1989. During the Bush Years, they continued to perform material that included international and foreign policy affairs (such as the United States invasion of Panama) and local gaffes (such as George Herbert Walker Bush's recognition of September 7 as Pearl Harbor Day) after Bush's 1988 election. The group became known for parodying Vice President Dan Quayle, particularly after Quayle's infamous correction of a child's spelling of "potato" by telling him to add a final -e.

The Capitol Steps released six albums during the elder Bush's presidency, including Stand By Your Dan, 76 Bad Loans, and Georgie on My Mind, and performed several times at the White House. On three occasions, the president accepted the group's invitation to sing songs poking fun at himself with them onstage.

Clinton years
Until the Lewinsky scandal, Bill Clinton's administration did not provided much fodder for new songs or albums, though a variety of personalities proved easy to exaggerate: the easygoing Clinton and the First Lady, Hillary, Vice-President Al Gore and Surgeon General Joycelyn Elders, who had suggested that masturbation could be a useful part of a comprehensive sex-education curriculum.

In 1994, the Capitol Steps performed at the White House for Clinton and Gore.

George W. Bush years
The 2000 presidential election yielded the pre-election "I Want a Brand New Pair of Candidates" and several other songs about the aborted recount.

The popular impression of George W. Bush's intellect, fed by his frequent grammatical errors in speeches, allowed the Capitol Steps to reuse much Dan Quayle material. Immediately after the events of September 11, 2001, jokes aimed at the president or  American politics no longer seemed appropriate to the general public. The group cancelled most of their performances for the next several weeks. The group soon found new material that people would find funny in October 2001. The group poked fun at the improved national view of Bush and at figures who were becoming more relevant to the American public, including New York Mayor Rudy Giuliani, British Prime Minister Tony Blair, and French President Jacques Chirac.

Heightened security nationwide soon became a popular subject for the Capitol Steps and other comedians in the wake of media reports that travelers were being questioned in airports for having powdered sugar from a donut on their clothing. 

In 2002 and 2003, their material lampooned SUVs and their drivers, Hans Blix, the collapse of Enron, the standoff with Saddam Hussein, Condoleezza Rice, Democratic hopefuls for the 2004 presidential nomination, the capture of Saddam Hussein, same-sex weddings, the Kobe Bryant trial, and the California gubernatorial recall election (in which they reused "The Fondler"—a Clinton-era parody of "The Wanderer"—with Arnold Schwarzenegger as the target). Since 2004 the Capitol Steps have remained topical with their parodies, releasing songs about the marriage of Prince Charles and Camilla Parker Bowles, U.S. immigration-reform-law proposals, and the Tom DeLay scandals.
On December 18, 2007, group co-founder Bill Strauss died at his home in McLean, Virginia of pancreatic cancer.

Obama years

They released several albums during the Obama administration, including Mock the Vote, How to Succeed in Congress without Really Lying, Fiscal Shades of Gray, Take the Money and Run for President, Desperate Housemembers, Liberal Shop of Horrors, and Obama Mia.

Trump years
They released Orange Is the New Barack in 2017.

Biden years
On January 25, 2021, an update on the Capitol Steps website indicated that "the Capitol Steps are planning to turn off the stage lights". As of 2022, several performers and a co-creator of the Capitol Steps are performing under the name DC’s Reflecting Fools. The new group blends new songs with classic Capitol Steps material.

Live shows

The Capitol Steps regularly performed as many as 700 shows per year.  As of 2017, the Capitol Steps had multiple casts, with 24 cast members:

 Brian Ash
 Jon Bell
 Bari Biern
 Mike Carruthers
 Evan Casey 
 Jenny Corbett
 Kevin Corbett
 Janet Davidson Gordon
 Nancy Dolliver
 Morgan Duncan
 Mark Eaton
 Corey Harris
 Prince Havely
 Emily Levey
 Elaina Newport
 Richard Paul
 Jack Rowles
 Ann Schmitt
 Tracey Stephens
 Mike Thornton
 Brad Van Grack
 Delores Williams
 Anne Willis Hill
 Jamie Zemarel

As of 2017 the group also had five pianists:

 Emily Bell Spitz
 Howard Breitbart 
 Marc Irwin
 David Kane
 Lenny Williams

The group performed public and private shows throughout the country, and appeared at the Ronald Reagan Building and International Trade Center in Washington, D.C. every Friday and Saturday at 7:30 p.m. year-round.

Recordings
Since their first album in 1984, the Capitol Steps have released a new recording of their songs, parodies, and sketches at least once a year (usually in the late spring). The group has also released holiday recordings in 1989, 1993 and 2006. A 2001 "special high school release", revised and re-released in 2005, is made up of songs written for participants of the National Young Leaders Conference in Washington, at which the group has performed. Their 20th-anniversary book included a CD retrospective of their work.

Discography

Albums

 Capitol Steps Live! at the Shoreham (1984)
 We Arm the World (1985)
 Thank God I'm a Contra Boy (1986)
 Workin' 9 to 10 (1987)
 Shamlet (1988)
 Stand By Your Dan (1989)
 Danny's First Noel (1989 holiday release)
 Georgie on My Mind (1989–1990)
 Sheik, Rattle and Roll (1990)
 76 Bad Loans (1991)
 Fools on the Hill (1992)
 The Joy of Sax (1993)
 All I Want for Christmas Is a Tax Increase (1993 holiday release)
 Lord of the Fries (1994)
 A Whole Newt World (1995)
 Return to Center (1996)
 Sixteen Scandals (1997)
 Unzippin' My Doo-dah (1998)
 First Lady and the Tramp (1999)
 It's Not Over 'Til the First Lady Sings (2000)
 I Want It Dad's Way (2001 high-school release, revised and re-released in 2005)
 One Bush, Two Bush, Old Bush, New Bush (2001)
 When Bush Comes to Shove (2002)
 Between Iraq and a Hard Place (2003)
 Papa's Got a Brand New Baghdad (2004)
 Four More Years in the Bush Leagues (2005)
 I'm So Indicted (2006)
 O Christmas Bush (2006 holiday release)
 Springtime for Liberals (2007)
 Campaign and Suffering (2008)
 Obama Mia! (2009)
 Barackin' Around the Christmas Tree (2009 holiday release)
 Liberal Shop of Horrors (2010)
 Desperate House Members (2011)
 Weiner Wonderland (2011 holiday release)
 Take the Money and Run for President (2012)
 Fiscal Shades of Grey (2013)
 How to Succeed in Congress Without Really Lying (2014)
 Mock the Vote (2015)
 What to Expect When You're Electing (2016)
 Orange Is the New Barack (2017)
 Make America Grin Again (2018)
 The Lyin' Kings (2019)

Singles
The group released Ronald the Red-Faced Reagan for the 1987 holidays, Like A Suburban Drone  in 1990 and From Yankee Doodle to Pander Bear, a history of American political satire, early in Bill Clinton's first term.

See also
Theatre in Washington, D.C.

References

Further reading

External links
Official Website
 https://www.youtube.com/user/CapitolSteps
[ Allmusic entry for the Capitol Steps]
[ Allmusic entry for Bill Strauss]
[ Allmusic entry for Elaina Newport]
[ Allmusic entry for Mark Eaton]

American satirists
American parodists
American political satire
Parody musicians
1981 establishments in Washington, D.C.
2021 disestablishments in Washington, D.C.